In graph theory, a perfect matching in a graph is a matching that covers every vertex of the graph.

A perfect matching is also called a 1-factor; see Graph factorization for an explanation of this term. In some literature, the term complete matching is used. 

Every perfect matching is a maximum-cardinality matching, but the opposite is not true. For example, consider the following graphs:

 

In graph (b) there is a perfect matching (of size 3) since all 6 vertices are matched; in graphs (a) and (c) there is a maximum-cardinality matching (of size 2) which is not perfect, since some vertices are unmatched.

A perfect matching is also a minimum-size edge cover. If there is a perfect matching, then both the matching number and the edge cover number equal  . 

A perfect matching can only occur when the graph has an even number of vertices. A near-perfect matching is one in which exactly one vertex is unmatched.  This can only occur when the graph has an odd number of vertices, and such a matching must be maximum. In the above figure, part (c) shows a near-perfect matching. If, for every vertex in a graph, there is a near-perfect matching that omits only that vertex, the graph is also called factor-critical.

Characterizations 
Hall's marriage theorem provides a characterization of bipartite graphs which have a perfect matching.

The Tutte theorem provides a characterization for arbitrary graphs.

A perfect matching is a spanning 1-regular subgraph, a.k.a. a 1-factor. In general, a spanning k-regular subgraph is a k-factor.

A spectral characterization for a graph to have a perfect matching is given by Hassani Monfared and Mallik as follows:  Let  be a graph on even  vertices and  be  distinct nonzero purely imaginary numbers. Then  has a perfect matching if and only if there is a real skew-symmetric matrix  with graph  and  eigenvalues .

Computation 
Deciding whether a graph admits a perfect matching can be done in polynomial time, using any algorithm for finding a maximum cardinality matching.

However, counting the number of perfect matchings, even in bipartite graphs, is #P-complete. This is because computing the permanent of an arbitrary 0–1 matrix (another #P-complete problem) is the same as computing the number of perfect matchings in the bipartite graph having the given matrix as its biadjacency matrix. 

A remarkable theorem of Kasteleyn states that the number of perfect matchings in a planar graph can be computed exactly in polynomial time via the FKT algorithm.

The number of perfect matchings in a complete graph Kn (with n even) is given by the double factorial:

Perfect matching polytope 

The perfect matching polytope of a graph is a polytope in R|E| in which each corner is an incidence vector of a perfect matching.

See also 
Envy-free matching
Maximum-cardinality matching
 Perfect matching in high-degree hypergraphs
 Hall-type theorems for hypergraphs

References 

Matching (graph theory)